United Serbia (JS) is a national-conservative political party in Serbia.

History
It was founded on 15 February 2004, as a split from the far-right Party of Serbian Unity with Dragan Marković Palma elected as the leader on the first party assembly. During its early years, the party had close relations with other right-wing parties such as New Serbia and Democratic Party of Serbia, even participating with them in the 2007 parliamentary election. During the 2008 parliamentary election, they participated in a coalition around the Socialist Party of Serbia and supported the accession of Serbia into the European Union.

United Serbia was the first to announce the beginning of talks with the coalition For a European Serbia, led by the President Boris Tadić, on forming the new government. The party leader is Dragan Marković, former mayor of Jagodina.

The United Serbia, including its leader Palma, supported the "Serbs for Trump" campaign and Donald Trump in the 2020 United States presidential election.

Political positions 
JS is positioned on the right-wing on the political spectrum, and it has been described as populist, and national-conservative. It is staunchly socially conservative, and it also advocates regionalism.

Electoral performance

Parliamentary elections

Presidential elections

References

External links
Official website 

2004 establishments in Serbia
Conservative parties in Serbia
Eastern Orthodox political parties
National conservative parties
Nationalist parties in Serbia
Political parties established in 2004
Serb nationalist parties
Social conservative parties
Right-wing populism in Serbia